Salaud, on t'aime (translated as We Love You, You Bastard) is a 2014 French drama film directed, produced and co-written by Claude Lelouch. It stars Johnny Hallyday, Sandrine Bonnaire and Eddy Mitchell.

Cast 

 Johnny Hallyday as Jacques Kaminsky
 Sandrine Bonnaire as Nathalie Béranger
 Eddy Mitchell as Frédéric Saldmann
 Irène Jacob as Printemps Kaminsky
 Pauline Lefèvre as Été Kaminsky
 Sarah Kazemy as Automne Kaminsky
 Jenna Thiam as Hiver Kaminsky
 Valérie Kaprisky as Francia
 Isabelle de Hertogh as Isabelle
 Astrid Whettnall as Astrid
 Rufus as Le Ruf
 Agnès Soral as Bianca Kaminsky
 Silvia Kahn as Marie Selman
 Antoine Duléry as The new owner
 Jacky Ido as Jacky
 Jérôme Cachon as Joseph Picard
 Rafaëlle Cohen as Vocalist #1

References

External links 
 

2014 films
2014 drama films
2010s French-language films
French drama films
Films directed by Claude Lelouch
Films scored by Francis Lai
Films about dysfunctional families
2010s French films